The Croydon Rams Baseball Club is a Baseball Club based in the outer Melbourne suburb of Croydon. That club's senior teams compete in the Melbourne Winter Baseball League and its Juniors compete in the Ringwood District Baseball League.

History
The club was formed before the 1964 Ringwood District Baseball League's senior winter competition. The club went on to win its first A grade premiership in 2008.

Premierships

References

External links
Croydon Baseball Club
Melbourne Winter Baseball League

1964 establishments in Australia
Baseball teams established in 1964
Sports clubs established in 1964
Australian baseball clubs
Baseball teams in Melbourne
Sport in the City of Maroondah